CitizenCOP is a mobile application, developed by the INFOCRATS Web Solutions Pvt. Ltd. and published in October 2012 as freeware. It is developed with the concept to leverage growing use of smart phones for safety of citizens and promote a crime free environment by encouraging voluntary anonymous crime reporting.
CitizenCOP app is currently operating in co-ordination of police departments of Bhopal, Indore, Jhansi, Raipur, Noida, Bengaluru and Navi Mumbai. In Raipur, Chief Minister Dr. Raman Singh presided over the launch of CitizenCOP app. For cities where CitizenCOP does not have police association, lite version of the application is working.

On 7 March 2016, full version of CitizenCOP was launched in co-ordination of police department of Noida, India. On the occasion of International Women's Day on 8 March 2016, CitizenCOP was launched in Varanasi in co-ordination with the police administration of the city.

Features 
CitizenCOP has been bundled with several personal safety and convenience features like /Incident Reporting, SOS Help, Towed Vehicle Search, News and Notifications, GEO Fencing, Police Phone Directory, Report Lost Article, My Safe Zone,  etc.

Report an Incident 
This feature is the key feature of the app. It gives each citizen a power to anonymously report crime to police. One needs to go to this option on the menu screen where he can upload images or videos of any incident he is witnessing as an evidence.

Help Me (SOS) 
This function lets the user send a SOS message for instant Help in emergency situations. The user needs to save up to four trusted contacts, who can be alerted through a SOS message sent via the App in case of emergency. On clicking 'Help Me' button, the application sends an auto generated message along with the real-time GEO location of the user. It also reports the same information to police control room to help them initiate quick action.

Police Phone Directory 
This function helps the user to know contact details of police authorities present in nearby police stations. On enabling GPS settings on mobile phone, user can get filtered police contacts that are relevant to user’s current location.

Towed Vehicle Search 
The police while towing a vehicle registers the pickup location and the location where they drop it. The user can search if their vehicle has been towed using the 'Towed Vehicle Search' option and entering Vehicle License plate number and the date.

My Safe Zone 
The user can set an area on map as a Safe Zone in which he feels secured. Whenever the user crosses the boundary mentioned, a SOS message will automatically be sent to preset contact numbers along with the police officials.

Police Notifications 
This App receives traffic alerts and other important announcements by police. The user also gets notified of any route diversions or heavy traffic forecasts.

Report Lost Article 

This feature allows users to report lost article like passport, PAN card, driving license and more instantly. Users do not need to personally go to the police station to lodge a complaint as it can be done via the app. In case of lost mobile, the user receives an email to confirm receipt of complaint. This letter can be used to issue new sim card so user does not have to visit police station.

Travel Safe 
This feature allows users to track the authenticity of the Cab, Auto Rickshaw Driver or Guard. It also allows users to send a message to their Emergency Contacts with details of the cab or auto rickshaw they are travelling in.

Awards and recognition
On January 30, 2014 CitizenCOP received an award as Best Emerging Technology at IMC - IT awards 2013. Then on July 18, 2014 CitizenCOP were runners up in the children and women empowerment category at the mBillionth Award South Asia Awards.

CitizenCOP has been awarded with "Salaam Madhya Pradesh Award" by Madhya Pradesh Police as the best app for "Innovation in Policing" category.

On 13 April 2015, CitizenCOP was presented the e-Governance Excellence Award. The award was given under the category  Improvement in Citizen Service Delivery/ Governance through use of IT (Private/ Non Govt Sector). Shivraj Singh Chouhan, the current Chief Minister of Madhya Pradesh, presided over the ceremony and presented the award.

References

External links

Official Facebook Page
Official Twitter Page

Mobile software